The Irish Institute of Medical Herbalists (IIMH) is the professional organization for medical herbalists in Ireland.  It was formally incorporated in 1990. The current criteria for membership of the IIMH is a BSc honours degree in herbal medicine which includes examinations in medicine and herbalism as well as supervised clinical practice. Members of the institute have the letters MIIMH after their names.

The IIMH developed the first BSc honours degree in herbal science in Ireland, in conjunction with Cork Institute of Technology.  This is a four-year full-time undergraduate degree which forms part one of the necessary training for medical herbalists in Ireland.  Part two comprises a two-year master's degree programme in clinical herbal medicine which is currently being developed and was due to commence in 2009.

References

Organizations established in 1990
Herbalism organizations
Professional associations based in Ireland
1990 establishments in Ireland
Medical and health organisations based in the Republic of Ireland